Lampranthus aureus is a species of shrub in the family Aizoaceae (stone plants). They are succulent plants. They have a self-supporting growth form and simple, broad leaves.

Phytochemistry
L. aureus contains mesembrenol and low levels of related alkaloids such as mesembrenone and have sometimes been mismarketed as Kanna (Sceletium tortuosum) extract which contains higher levels of related alkaloids.

Sources

References 

aureus
Taxa named by N. E. Brown
Taxa named by Carl Linnaeus